Eremias fasciata (commonly known as the Sistan racerunner) is a species of lizard found in Iran, Afghanistan, and Pakistan.

References

Eremias
Reptiles described in 1874
Taxa named by William Thomas Blanford